Only God Forgives is a 2013 action film written and directed by Nicolas Winding Refn and starring Ryan Gosling, Kristin Scott Thomas, and Vithaya Pansringarm. The film was shot on location in Bangkok, Thailand, and, as with the director's earlier film Drive, is dedicated to Chilean director Alejandro Jodorowsky. It competed for the Palme d'Or at the 2013 Cannes Film Festival.

Only God Forgives opened at the 2013 Cannes Film Festival to polarized reviews. Most of the criticism focused on the screenplay and characterization, while praise was directed towards the visuals and soundtrack.

Plot
Brothers Julian and Billy, American expatriates, run a Muay Thai boxing club in Bangkok, Thailand, as a front for drug dealing. One night, Billy goes looking for sex. He visits a brothel, saying he wants a fourteen-year-old girl but the brothel-keeper refuses. Billy asks if the brothel-master has a daughter and when told that he has, Billy says to bring her in. After the brothel-master refuses, Billy attacks him with a wine bottle, and breaks into the room where the prostitutes are on display, attacking one of them. At another location, he later rapes and kills an underage prostitute and is cornered by Thai police. Chang, the vigilante-like police lieutenant, brings the girl's father Choi to identify his daughter's body and allows Choi to beat Billy to death. Julian, the quiet brother, likes to be tied up while watching his favorite prostitute, Mai, masturbate.  Chang later severs Choi's right forearm with his sword for allowing his daughter to be a prostitute. During a session with Mai, Julian has a vision of his hand being cut off by Chang in a dark room.

Upon discovering his brother's murder, Julian and his crew confront Choi, but Julian spares his life. Crystal, the brothers' mother, arrives in Bangkok and demands that he kill the man responsible for Billy's death. Julian refuses, believing Choi's revenge was justified. After having Choi killed, Crystal learns of Chang's involvement. She meets with Byron, a rival drug dealer, and offers to cut him into her drug operation in exchange for a hit on Chang.

Chang investigates Choi's murder and concludes Julian isn't the killer. That evening, Julian brings Mai, posing as his girlfriend, to meet Crystal at a restaurant. Crystal discovers the ruse, insults Mai and demeans Julian, pronouncing him sexually inferior to Billy and saying that Billy was everything that Julian isn't. Julian accepts Crystal's verbal abuse. After the dinner, when Mai asks why he lets her behave that way, Julian tells her "She's my mother." He tells her she can keep the dress he bought for her to wear to the dinner but she refuses it. Julian becomes angry and tells her to take the dress off. She does so, stripping to her underwear and holding the dress out to Julian.

Two hitmen hired by Byron attempt to kill Chang with machine guns at a restaurant, causing the deaths of numerous customers and two of Chang's men. Chang kills one, then brutally tortures and interrogates the other one. The hitman leads Chang to Li Po, who has resorted to arranging hits to pay for his disabled son. Chang kills the hitman with his sword but spares Li Po. Chang finds Byron in a club and tortures him to death, but fails to find who ordered the hit.

After recognizing Chang as the man from his visions and failing to follow him, Julian eventually finds Chang and challenges him to a fight at his boxing club. Chang quickly defeats Julian, who fails to land a single blow. Afterwards, Crystal tells Julian that Chang has figured out she ordered the hit. She pleads with Julian to kill Chang, like he killed his father for her. She promises that after Julian eliminates Chang, they'll go back home and she'll be a true mother to him.

With his associate Charlie, Julian infiltrates Chang's home and plan to ambush him. After learning Charlie was instructed to execute the entire family, Julian kills Charlie before he can murder Chang's daughter.

Chang confronts Crystal in her hotel room. She tells him that Julian killed his father with his bare hands and that Julian is violent and deranged. Chang stabs her in the throat. Later, Julian returns to the hotel and finds his mother's corpse. He approaches her body, cuts open her abdomen, and shoves his hand inside it.

Julian later stands in a field with Chang, offering him his hands voluntarily so he can cut them off with the same weapon with which he killed Crystal. Chang is last seen performing a song in a karaoke club filled with fellow police officers.

Cast
 Ryan Gosling as Julian Thompson, an American who lives in Bangkok and "is a respected figure in the criminal underworld" according to a production synopsis. Gosling was in negotiations to star in the film in June 2011 after Luke Evans dropped out due to scheduling conflicts with The Hobbit: An Unexpected Journey. Gosling had undertaken Muay Thai training in preparation for the role by that September, which included 2–3 hour daily sessions. Refn also participated in the training. Gosling and Refn had recently worked together on the neo-noir action drama Drive (2011). Julian speaks only 17 lines throughout the film. The idea for Julian to stick his hand into his dead mother's womb came from Gosling himself.
 Kristin Scott Thomas as Crystal Thompson, Julian's mother, who is described as "a merciless and terrifying mafia godmother" combining elements of Lady Macbeth and Donatella Versace. Scott Thomas was cast by May 2011.
 Vithaya Pansringarm as Lieutenant Chang / "The Angel of Vengeance", a man that believes himself to be God "[i]n the sense that God in the Old Testament is saying 'I can be cruel, you have to fear me' as 'I can be kind, you have to love me. Pansringarm did his own Thai boxing and singing for his role. Refn stated in an interview: "The character of One Eye went into Drive then went into the Thai police lieutenant. They're the same character played by three different actors [...] a mythological creature that has a mysterious past but cannot relate to reality because he's heightened and he's pure fetish."
 Gordon Brown as Gordon, Julian and Billy's lieutenant. Brown earlier played a walk-on role in Refn's Bronson and a supporting part in Valhalla Rising.
 Rhatha Phongam (Yaya-Ying) as Mai, a prostitute associated with Julian
 Tom Burke as Billy Thompson, Julian's older brother
 Byron Gibson as Byron
 Danai Thiengdham as Li Po
 Sahajak Boonthanakit as Pol Col. Kim
 Nophand Boonyai as Charlie
 Teerawat Mulvilai as Ko Sam
 Kovit Wattanakul as Choi Yan Lee
 Wittchuta Watjanarat as Ma Fong

Production
Refn has said that "[f]rom the beginning, [he] had the idea of a thriller produced as a western, all in the Far East, and with a modern cowboy hero." He originally planned to direct Only God Forgives directly after Valhalla Rising (2009), but he accepted Gosling's request to direct Drive instead. Gosling has described the script of Only God Forgives as "the strangest thing I've ever read and it's only going to get stranger." Like Drive, the film was largely shot chronologically and scenes were often edited the day they were shot.

Footage was screened at the 2012 Cannes Film Festival. Refn drew a connection between Only God Forgives and Drive, saying that "[Only God Forgives] is very much a continuation of that language"—"[i]t's based on real emotions, but set in a heightened reality. It's a fairy tale."

Reception
The film received a very divided response at its Cannes press screening; it was booed by many of the audience of journalists and critics while also receiving a standing ovation.
It received a polarized response from mainstream critics: review aggregator Rotten Tomatoes gives the film a score of 41% based on reviews from 163 critics, with a weighted average of 5.30/10. The site's consensus states: "Director Refn remains as visually stylish as ever, but Only God Forgives fails to add enough narrative smarts or relatable characters to ground its beautifully filmed depravity." Metacritic assigns the film a weighted average rating of 37 out of 100 based on the reviews of 39 professional critics, indicating "generally unfavorable reviews".

Robbie Collin of The Daily Telegraph reflected concerns over the film in a three out of five star review. "The film's characters are non-people; the things they say to each other are non-conversations, the events they enact are non-drama," he wrote. But he praised Refn for following up his commercially successful film Drive with "...this abstruse, neon-dunked nightmare that spits in the face of coherence and flicks at the earlobes of good taste".

Peter Bradshaw of The Guardian gave it five out of five stars, calling it gripping and praising the "pure formal brilliance" of every scene and frame, though he notes that it will "have people running for the exits, and running for the hills" with its extreme violence. In an alternative review published in The Guardian, John Patterson was highly critical of the film, citing its lack of originality and the low degree of focus on plot: "Somewhere in here is a story that Refn can hardly be bothered to tell... I feel the ghosts of other movies—his influences, his inspirations—crowding in on his own work, suffocating him, and somehow leaving less of him on screen."

Bill Gibron of PopMatters wrote "David Lynch must be laughing. If he had created something like Only God Forgives, substituting his own quirky casting for the rather staid choices made by actual director Nicolas Winding Refn, he would have walked away from Cannes 2013 with yet another Palme d'Or, another notch in his already sizeable artistic belt, and the kind of critical appreciation that only comes when a proven auteur once again establishes his creative credentials."

Richard Roeper of the Chicago Sun-Times gave this film a positive review, giving it three and a half stars saying: "Refn's follow-up effort to the similarly polarizing Drive (which I thought was flat-out great) is even more stylized and daring. Drive star Ryan Gosling (who is clearly interested in carving out a career with at least as many bold, indie-type roles as commercial, leading-man fare) strikes a Brando pose playing Julian, a smoldering, seemingly lethal American who navigates the seediest sides of Bangkok."

In 2015, the film was included in The Guardians top 50 films of the decade so far.

Awards

The film won the Grand Prize at the Sydney Film Festival.

References

External links
 
 
 
 
 

2013 films
2013 crime action films
2013 action drama films
2013 crime drama films
Danish action drama films
Danish crime action films
French crime action films
French action drama films
French crime drama films
English-language Danish films
English-language French films
Thai-language films
Films directed by Nicolas Winding Refn
Films about prostitution in Thailand
Films set in Thailand
Films shot in Bangkok
Danish independent films
Gaumont Film Company films
Bold Films films
Films scored by Cliff Martinez
French independent films
2013 independent films
Films set in Bangkok
2010s English-language films
2010s French films